Estêvão Willian Almeida de Oliveira Gonçalves (born 24 April 2007), known as Estevão Willian or simply Estevão, is a Brazilian footballer who plays as a winger for Campeonato Brasileiro Série A club Palmeiras. He is considered one of the best football prospects in the world.

Career
Estêvão Willian was born in Franca, Brazil, and began his youth career with the academy of Cruzeiro in 2017. He originally used the nickname Messinho as an homage to Lionel Messi, due to similarities in their playing style. The following year 2018 at the age of 10, Estêvão signed a professional contract with Nike, making him their youngest Brazilian player to sign with the company surpassing Rodrygo Goes. He moved to the youth academy of Palmeiras on 6 May 2021, signing a trainee contract.

International career
Estêvão Willian was first called up to represent the Brazil U17s in October 2022 for a set of friendlies in October 2022.

Honours

Club
Palmeiras
 : 2021
 : 2021
 Copa do Brasil Sub-17: 2022
 Campeonato Brasileiro Sub-17: 2022

References

External links
 Estevão Willian at playmakerstats.com (English version of ogol.com.br)
 Palmeiras profile

Living people
2007 births
People from Franca
Brazilian footballers
Association football wingers
Sociedade Esportiva Palmeiras players